Cratoxyleae is a tribe of plants in the Hypericaceae family known as yellow cattle woods. It contains the genera Cratoxylum, Eliea, and Triadenum.

References 

 
Plant tribes